The 2020–21 Toto Cup Leumit was the 31st season of the second tier League Cup (as a separate competition) since its introduction. It was divided into two stages. First, the sixteen Liga Leumit teams were divided into four regionalized groups, the groups winners with the best record advancing to the final, while the rest of the clubs were scheduled to play classification play-offs accordance according the group results.

The final, played on 20 August 2020, Hapoel Nof HaGalil defeated Hapoel Petah Tikva 3–0.

Group stage
Groups were allocated according to geographic distribution of the clubs

Group A

Group B

Group C

Group D

Classification play-offs

13-16th classification play-offs

9-12th classification play-offs

5-8th classification play-offs

3-4th classification play-offs

Final

Final rankings

See also
 2020–21 Toto Cup Al
 2020–21 Liga Leumit
 2020–21 Israel State Cup

References

External links

Leumit
Toto Cup Leumit
Toto Cup Leumit